Charles-Aimé Kirkland (November 16, 1896 – August 9, 1961) was a Canadian politician serving as the Liberal member of the Legislative Assembly of Quebec in the provincial riding of Jacques-Cartier from 1939 to 1961.

Kirkland was the son of Joseph Kirkland, a Canadian Pacific employee, and Rosalie Lanctôt.

Kirkland served during World War I with the Royal Canadian Engineers, then studied medicine at Laval and Harvard.

The Town of Kirkland is named in his honour, as well as the now-closed Charles A. Kirkland Elementary school in Roxboro, Quebec.

He was the father of Marie-Claire Kirkland.

References
 

1896 births
1961 deaths
People from Saint-Constant, Quebec
Quebec Liberal Party MNAs
Université Laval alumni
Harvard Medical School alumni